The Päivi Halonen Award is an ice hockey trophy awarded seasonally by the Finnish Ice Hockey Association to the best defenceman in the Naisten Liiga, called the Naisten SM-sarja during 1982 to 2017. It is named after Päivi Virta, previously Halonen, former SM-sarja defender and trailblazer for women's ice hockey in Finland, who won fifteen Finnish Championship titles during her career, four more than any other player in league history.

Award winners 

Source: Elite Prospects

All-time award recipients

References

Naisten Liiga (ice hockey) trophies and awards